Ikha is a rural locality (a selo) in Khubarsky Selsoviet, Kazbekovsky District, Republic of Dagestan, Russia. The population was 462 as of 2010.

Geography
Ikha is located 19 km east of Dylym (the district's administrative centre) by road. Khubar and Novo-Zubutli are the nearest rural localities.

Nationalities 
Avars live there.

Famous residents 
 Zubair Saydulayev (chairman of the collective farm Friendship, awarded the Order of the Red Star)

References 

Rural localities in Kazbekovsky District